J. Da Silva is a former West Indian cricket umpire. He stood in one Test match, West Indies vs. England, in 1948.

See also
 List of Test cricket umpires

References

Year of birth missing
Possibly living people
Place of birth missing
Missing middle or first names
West Indian Test cricket umpires